Due to the secretive nature of Hollywood accounting, it is not clear which film is the most expensive film ever made. Star Wars: The Force Awakens officially holds the record with a net budget of $447 million (although it is possible that Avatar: The Way of Water costs more if its price tag is towards the upper-end of its reported $350–460 million production costs), while The Hobbit trilogy stands as the most expensive back-to-back film production, with combined costs of $623 million after tax credits.

Inflation, filming techniques and external market forces affect the economics of film production. Costs rose steadily during the silent era with Ben-Hur: A Tale of the Christ (1925) setting a record that lasted well into the sound era. Television had an impact on rising costs in the 1950s and early 1960s as cinema competed with it for audiences, culminating in 1963 with Cleopatra; despite being the highest earning film of the year, Cleopatra did not earn back its costs on its original release. The 1990s saw two thresholds crossed, with True Lies costing $100 million in 1994 and Titanic costing $200 million in 1997, both directed by James Cameron. Since then it has become normal for a tent-pole feature from a major film studio to cost over $100 million and an increasing number of films are costing $200 million or more.

This list contains only films already released to the general public and not films that are still in production, post-production or just announced films, as costs can change during the production process. Listed below is the net negative cost: the costs of the actual filming, not including promotional costs (i.e. advertisements, commercials, posters, etc.) and after accounting for tax subsidies. The charts are ordered by budgets officially acknowledged by the production companies where they are known; most companies will not give a statement on the actual production costs, only estimates by professional researchers and movie industry writers are available. Where budget estimates conflict, the productions are charted by lower-bound estimates.

Most expensive productions (unadjusted for inflation)
Only productions with a net budget of at least $200 million in nominal U.S. dollars are listed here. Due to the effects of inflation, all but one of the films on the chart have been produced in the 21st century.

 Officially acknowledged figure.

Most expensive films (adjusted for inflation)

The productions listed here have their nominal budgets adjusted for inflation using the United States Consumer Price Index taking the year of release. Charts adjusted for inflation are usually ordered differently, because they are dependent on the inflation measure used and the original budget estimate.

The Soviet War and Peace, released in four parts across 1966 and 1967, is sometimes cited as the most expensive production ever: Soviet claims stating it cost $100 million (estimated at nearly $700 million accounting for inflation forty years after its release) were circulated in the American press during its showing there. However, its financial records reveal it cost slightly more than $9 million (about $60–70 million in today's money). Another notable omission is Metropolis, the 1927 German film directed by Fritz Lang, often erroneously reported as having cost $200 million at the value of modern money. Metropolis cost $1.2–1.3 million at the time of its production, which would be about $ million at 2021 prices according to the German consumer price index.

 Officially acknowledged figure.

Record-holders 

Throughout the silent era, the cost of film-making grew steadily as films became longer and more ambitious and the techniques and equipment became more sophisticated. It is not known for certain which was the first film to cost $1 million or more to produce, and several myths have grown over time: D. W. Griffith's Intolerance (1916) was reputed to have cost $2 million, but accounts show that it only cost $385,906.77; additionally, A Daughter of the Gods (1916) was advertised as costing a million dollars, but Variety estimated its true cost at $850,000. The first film that is confirmed to have had a $1 million budget is Foolish Wives (1922), with the studio advertising it as "The First Real Million Dollar Picture".

The most expensive film of the silent era was Ben-Hur: A Tale of the Christ (1925), costing about $4 million—twenty-five times the $160,000 average cost of an MGM feature. It is unclear which sound-era production superseded it as the most expensive film, although this is commonly attributed to Hell's Angels (1930), directed by Howard Hughes; the accounts for Hell's Angels show it cost $2.8 million, but Hughes publicised it as costing $4 million, selling it to the media as the most expensive film ever made. The first film to seriously challenge the record was Gone with the Wind, reported to have cost about $3.9–4.25 million, although sources from the time state that Ben-Hur and—erroneously—Hell's Angels cost more. Ben-Hur was definitively displaced at the top of the chart by Duel in the Sun in 1946.

The 1950s saw costs rapidly escalate as cinema competed with television for audiences, culminating with some hugely expensive epics in the 1960s that failed to recoup their costs.  A prominent example of this trend was Cleopatra (1963), which lost money on its initial release despite being the highest-grossing film of the year. Since the 1990s, film budgets have once again seen a dramatic increase as the use of computer-generated imagery (CGI) has become commonplace in big-budget features.

See also
 Film finance
 List of biggest box-office bombs
 List of highest-grossing films

Notes

References

External links
 The 30 Most Expensive Movies Ever Made at Business Insider
 Hollywood's Most Expensive Movies at Forbes

 
Lists of films by type